Szymon Bobrowski (born 16 January 1972 in Konin, Poland) is a Polish actor.

Acted in tens of cinema and TV films, as well as theatre plays.

Filmography
Magda M.
Hania
S@motność w sieci
Na dobre i na złe
Operacja "Koza"
Serce na dłoni
Złoty środek
Twarzą w twarz
Klub szalonych dziewic
Świadek koronny
The Supplement

References

External links

Living people
1972 births
Polish male actors